The 197th Ohio Infantry Regiment, sometimes 197th Ohio Volunteer Infantry (or 197th OVI) was an infantry regiment in the Union Army during the American Civil War.

Service
The 197th Ohio Infantry was organized at Camp Chase in Columbus, Ohio, and mustered in March 28, 1865, for one year service under the command of Colonel Benton Halstead.

The regiment left Ohio for Washington, D.C., April 25, 1865, and was assigned to a Provisional Brigade, IX Corps. It served duty at Washington, D.C. and Alexandria, Virginia, until May 11, then moved to Dover, Delaware, and served duty at Camp Harrington until May 31.  The regiment was then attached to 3rd Separate Brigade, VIII Corps, to May 1865. Moved to Havre de Grace May 31, and assigned to guard duty on the Philadelphia, Wilmington & Baltimore Railroad by detachments until July. Moved to Baltimore, Maryland, July 3, and served guard duty at various camps and hospitals around that city until July 31.

The 197th Ohio Infantry mustered out of service July 31, 1865, at Baltimore, Maryland.

Casualties
The regiment lost a total of 18 enlisted men during service, all due to disease.

Commanders
 Colonel Benton Halstead

See also

 List of Ohio Civil War units
 Ohio in the Civil War

References
 Dyer, Frederick H. A Compendium of the War of the Rebellion (Des Moines, IA:  Dyer Pub. Co.), 1908.
 Ohio Roster Commission. Official Roster of the Soldiers of the State of Ohio in the War on the Rebellion, 1861–1865, Compiled Under the Direction of the Roster Commission (Akron, OH: Werner Co.), 1886–1895.
 Reid, Whitelaw. Ohio in the War: Her Statesmen, Her Generals, and Soldiers (Cincinnati, OH: Moore, Wilstach, & Baldwin), 1868. 
Attribution

External links
 Ohio in the Civil War: 197th Ohio Volunteer Infantry by Larry Stevens
 National flag of the 197th Ohio Infantry
 Regimental flag of the 197th Ohio Infantry

Military units and formations established in 1865
Military units and formations disestablished in 1865
Units and formations of the Union Army from Ohio
1865 establishments in Ohio